Wrestling was contested at the 2009 Southeast Asian Games in Vientiane, Laos from December 15 to December 17 at the Booyong Gymnasium.

Medal summary

Medalists

Men

Freestyle

Greco-Roman

Women

External links
 SEA Games 2009 Official Report
 Result System
 Result System-Women's Wrestling 48-51 kg

2009 Southeast Asian Games events
Wrestling at the Southeast Asian Games